Debora van der Plas (1616–1680) was a Dutch born, Swedish entrepreneur.

Biography

She was born at Dordrecht in the Netherlands. She was the daughter of the Dutch artist Laurens van der Plas (1579-1629). He had immigrated to Sweden in 1618 and became a court painter in 1621. Around 1620, Laurens van der Plas leased the manor Axbergshammars Bruk in Närke.  
In 1644, she married Jan van Ruyff, a merchant and leading member of the Dutch colony in Stockholm.

After the death of her spouse in 1658, she took control over his business and became one of Sweden's most notable skippers and exporters of iron and copper. She conducted business with trading companies principally in England and the Netherlands. Among her business partners were the London based trading company Marescoe-Joyes, managed by Leonora Marescoe (1637-1715), widow of Charles Marescoe (1630-1670). 

She retired for health reasons in 1672 and left control of the company to her son-in-law Henrik Cletcher (1632-1695), husband of her daughter, Gertrud Maria Charlotta Cletzer (b. circa 1645).

References

Further reading 
 

1616 births
1680 deaths
Dutch expatriates in Sweden
People from Dordrecht
People of the Swedish Empire
17th-century Swedish businesswomen
17th-century Swedish businesspeople
Swedish businesspeople in shipping